Enzo Vera (born 7 April 1983) is a Chilean former footballer.

Club career
Born in Santiago, he joined powerhouse Colo-Colo, playing in its youth ranks. In 2002, he was part of the Torneo Clausura’s team champion, which achieved the league title amid the club’s bankruptcy. In that team highlighted players like Marcelo Barticciotto and Marcelo Espina.

In 2003, he left the club and signed for Deportes Iberia, playing there until the incoming year. Then in 2005, he moved to Deportes Temuco, when played until 2007 and was part of two relegations (to the second-tier or Primera B that 2005 and to third-tier two years later with Eduardo Bonvallet as coach).

In 2008 signed for Deportes Copiapó. The next year played for Deportes Naval until 2010.

In January 2011, he moved to Unión San Felipe, being a regular starter during the years that he played there. In late 2012, he left the club and finally in 2013 played in his last club of his career, Deportes Linares of the Chilean third-level in the age.

Honours

Club
Colo-Colo
 Campeonato Nacional (Chile): 2002 Apertura

References

External links
 
 

1983 births
Living people
Chilean footballers
Chilean people of German descent
Colo-Colo footballers
Unión San Felipe footballers
Deportes Linares footballers
Deportes Copiapó footballers
Naval de Talcahuano footballers
Deportes Temuco footballers
Segunda División Profesional de Chile players
Chilean Primera División players
Primera B de Chile players
Association football midfielders